The 1942 Ohio Northern Polar Bears football team was an American football team that represented Ohio Northern University in the Ohio Athletic Conference (OAC) during the 1942 college football season. The Polar Bears compiled a 6–1–1 record (5–0–1 against OAC opponents), won the OAC championship, and outscored opponents by a total of 171 to 25. 

Millard "Lefty" Murphy was the head coach. He had been the Ada High School coach one year earlier. Charles Heck and Collins Stackhouse led the team on offense.

Schedule

References

Ohio Northern
Ohio Northern Polar Bears football seasons
Ohio Northern football